Dvoranci is a village in Croatia. In 1991, it had a population of 222.

References 

Populated places in Zagreb County